Khara (also Romanized as Khārā; also known as Kharaw and Khareh) is a village in Jarqavieh Olya Rural District, Jarqavieh Olya District, Isfahan County, Isfahan Province, Iran. At the 2006 census, its population was 699, in 183 families.

References 

Populated places in Isfahan County